Norman Giller (born 18 April 1940, Stepney, East End, London) is an English author, a sports historian and television scriptwriter, who in October 2015 had his 100th book published. His 101st book, July 30, 1966 Football's Longest Day, was published in 2016 to coincide with the 50th anniversary of England's World Cup final victory at Wembley.
With 121 books to his name, Norman Giller is a prolific author who began as a Fleet Street journalist. He was chief football reporter with the Daily Express in London (1966–74, succeeding Clive Toye), and has been a freelance writer since leaving Fleet Street in 1974. He spent 14 years as a member of the This Is Your Life scriptwriting team, and devised several television series including Who's the Greatest? (ITV, 1980s), The Games of 48 and Over the Moon, Brian, with Brian Moore and Brian Clough (ITV 1990s), Petrolheads (BBC2 2006); he co-produced 63 editions of Stand and Deliver (Sky TV, 1990s), and was scriptwriter and co-producer with Top Gear director Brian Klein of more than 50 sports-based videos/DVDs, featuring celebrities such as Alan Hansen, Ray Winstone, John Motson, Dickie Bird, Frank Bruno, Frankie Dettori, Lawrence Dallaglio, Harry Carpenter, and Jimmy Greaves.

Giller's output has also included crosswords and puzzle games with The Times, Daily and Sunday Express, The Sun, The Sunday Telegraph and London Evening News.  He has compiled the annual Times Sports Jumbo Crossword for 38 consecutive years, setting more than 6,000 clues.

His 100th book, published in October 2015, is an autobiography called Headlines Deadlines All My Life, introduced by comedy actor Ricky Tomlinson, Giller tells his life story from his early days in bomb-blitzed East London to becoming one of Fleet Street's best known sports writers and a prolific television scriptwriter and DVD and TV programme creator. In his near-65 year writing career, Giller has had more than 30 million words published in books, newspapers and magazines.

His 93rd book, Sir Henry Cooper A Hero for All Time, was published in June 2012, and before that he self-published Tottenham, The Glory-Glory Game, which he wrote with members of the Spurs Writers' Club, which he formed in 2011.

Book No 94 followed in December 2012. It is called Bobby Moore The Master, and tells the story of the former England football captain's life on and off the pitch. All profits for the book go to the Bobby Moore Cancer Fund and it was published to coincide with the 20th anniversary of Moore's death from bowel cancer in February 2013. No 95 was Keys to Paradise, an adult novel in harness with first-time American novelist, Jeni Robbins.

The 96th book from the Giller pen is Bill Nicholson Revisited, based on conversations over a span of more than 40 years with former Spurs manager Nicholson  It was published in the autumn of 2013. Book No 97, published in June 2014 is a biography of former Northern Ireland skipper and, later, journalist Danny Blanchflower, who famously turned down the This Is Your Life book. The book is called Danny Blanchflower, This WAS His Life, profits from the book go to the Tottenham Tribute Trust, to help old players suffering from the sort of dementia that clouded Blanchflower's final years.

Giller was the argument-settling Judge of The Sun for ten years, and he and his sports statistician son Michael set the 2,000 questions for the DVD version of Football Trivial Pursuit. With his then business partner Peter Lorenzo and associate Malcolm Rowley, Giller created one of the first major pub quiz competitions in 1974. It was called What's Yours? and had 64 competing pubs in a series sponsored by the Charrington's chain in south-east England.

In late 2011, Giller had his 90th book published, Tottenham, the Managing Game, written with the help of his Facebook and Twitter friends.

His 81st book was a collaboration with Pelé and Gordon Banks and in partnership with their UK agent Terry Baker, a limited edition featuring an in-depth look at their careers and, in particular, the famous Banks save against Pelé for England against Brazil in the 1970 World Cup finals. Giller has a regular Fleet Street nostalgia blog at the Sports Journalists' Association website

Giller's 82nd book was The Lane of Dreams, a complete history of the Tottenham Hotspur ground at White Hart Lane before the bulldozers move in. The book is introduced by Jimmy Greaves and Steve Perryman. It is a self-published book by Giller, who experimented by having the second-half written on line by Tottenham supporters. He had six books published in 2010, written in collaboration with his sports statistician son, Michael Giller, and sports agent Terry Baker: Jimmy Greaves At Seventy and The Golden Double, the story of Tottenham's historic League and FA Cup triumph in 1960–61, Greavsie's Greatest (The 50 greatest post-war British strikers, selected by Jimmy Greaves), World Cup 2010, (a day to day diary of the tournament), Chopper's Chelsea, in collaboration with former Stamford Bridge captain Ron Harris, and Hammers-80, the story of West Ham United's FA Cup success of 1979–80, introduced by Sir Trevor Brooking. His 88th book is a powerful novel about corruption in football, The Glory and the Greed''', which has been produced ahead of traditional publication as an e-Book for reading on screen. Book No. 98, published in November 2014, was Spurs IQ, a part history, part quiz book about Tottenham Hotspur.

His 99th book, The Ali Files, was published in April 2015, and gives a fight-by-fight analysis of Muhammad Ali's ring career. In 2017 he self-published his 105th book: How to SELF Publish. His four books published in 2018/19 have been The Real Rocky, the Rocky Marciano story, Spurs '67, Billy Wright, My Dad with Vicky Wright, and Beyond the Krays, an eBook crime novel. During Lockdown, Giller completed a trilogy of crime novels featuring fictional Fleet Street journalist turned private investigator, JC Campbell, bringing his total of books published to 115.

Still in 'Lockdown'. Giller wrote  am autobiographical football book called 'My 70 Years of Spurs', and he collaborated with his long-time friend Sir Geoff Hurst on a book marking the 1966 World Cup hat-trick hero's 80th birthday, called Eighty At Eighty' This was published in the Autumn of 2021. He delivered the eulogy for his life-long friend Jimmy Greaves and the official biography, The One and Only Jimmy Greaves, was his 119th book www.normangillerbooks.com He has since had published a biography of former England and Spurs centre-forward Bobby Smith (The Forgotten Hero), and has two more books, The Man Who Put A Curse on Muhammad Ali and The G-Men (Greaves and Gilzean) coming out in the spring of 2023.

Biography
Giller was born in London's East End in the first year of the Second World War, and was evacuated with his mother and three brothers to a Devonshire farm. Educated at Raine's Foundation Grammar School in Stepney, he left at 15 to become a copyboy with the London Evening News. He started his reporting career with the Stratford Express in West Ham (1957), and arrived at the Daily Express after employment as a sports sub-editor with Boxing News, the London Evening Standard and the Daily Herald.

Giller has worked extensively in PR and for ten years represented former boxing world champions Frank Bruno, John H Stracey, Jim Watt, Maurice Hope (all managed by his friend Terry Lawless), and (for his European fights) Muhammad Ali ("He needed a PR like Einstein needed a calculator", says Giller). He wrote regular newspaper and magazine columns in harness with Eric Morecambe for nine years, and also had collaborations with comedians Benny Hill and Tommy Cooper. Giller was commissioned to write six Carry On novels, sequels to the popular films. He also scripted an adult pantomime for EastEnders co-stars Mike Reid and Barbara Windsor, and was chief scriptwriter for the Laureus World Sports Awards when they were staged in Monte Carlo.

He was married for 45 years to Eileen, who died in 2006. Giller has two grown children, Lisa and Michael,  four grandchildren and twin great grandsons. When Eileen Giller died following renal failure, Giller raised more than £15,000 for the Dorset Kidney Fund in her memory.

Giller is currently based in Essex after running a sports facts, figures and research service with his son, Michael. They organized themed quiz nights. Giller and Jackie Wright, specialised in Powerpoint-supported presentations on such themes as the life and music of Rodgers and Hart, the Gershwin brothers and Frank Sinatra; also the Footballing Fifties and Sixties, and the life and times of Billy Wright and Denis Compton, plus an illustrated lecture for literary associations and clubs entitled 'If You Can Write A Postcard, You Can Write A Book'.

Giller was webmaster for the recently disbanded Wessex branch of the Frank Sinatra Music Society. He was for many years a resident columnist on the Sports Journalists' Association website, writes regular blogs for the Spurs Odyssey website and is a columnist contributor to the sports retro magazines BackPass (football) and BackSpin (cricket).

Bibliography

Comedy novelizations

Novels

Books in collaboration with Ricky Tomlinson

 Books in collaboration with Jimmy Greaves 

 Television 
 This Is Your Life scriptwriter (1981–1995)
 Including programmes featuring Sir Richard Branson, Sir Jimmy Savile, Frank Bruno, Paul Daniels, Simon Weston, Ruth Madoc, Dan Maskell, Cliff Morgan, Denis Compton, Billy Wright, Peter Shilton, John Surtees, Nigel Mansell, Peter Alliss, Henry Cotton, Terry Lawless, Joe Johnson, James Herbert, Jack 'Kid' Berg, Reg Gutteridge, Mike Reid, Stan Boardman, Benny Green, George Shearing, Helen Shapiro
 Who's the Greatest, devisor and scriptwriter of an ITV series that involved celebrities such as:
 Sir David Frost, Sir Michael Parkinson, Sir Jeffrey Archer, Tom Graveney, Gloria Hunniford, Eamonn Andrews, Tom O'Connor, Stan Boardman, Bernie Winters, Dennis Waterman, Willie Rushton and Henry Cooper.
 Stunt Challenge for ITV (in the 1980s, scriptwriter with Derek Thompson.
 Stand and Deliver for Sky TV (co-producer with Brian Klein of on the Box Productions)
63 comedy programmes featuring, among others, Mike Reid, Norman Collier, Frank Carson, Jim Bowen, Stan Boardman, Ted Rogers, Cannon and Ball and Bernard Manning.
 The Games of 48 (ITV 1998, devisor and scriptwriter with Brian Moore)
Guests included Olympic legends Emil Zátopek, Fanny Blankers-Koen and Bob Mathias
 Petrolheads (2006 for BBC2), devisor and scriptwriter
Regular panellists were Richard Hammond, Chris Barrie and presenter Neil Morrissey. Featured guests included Eamonn Holmes, Murray Walker, Ricky Tomlinson, Ronan Keating, James May, Philip Glenister.
 Over the Moon, Brian'' (ITV), devisor and scriptwriter
Tribute series to Brian Moore, with guests including Brian Clough and Jack Charlton

References

External links
 Norman Giller at Google Book Search
Norman Giller books

1940 births
English sportswriters
English male journalists
English comedy writers
People from Stepney
English screenwriters
English male screenwriters
English historians
English television writers
English columnists
Living people
People educated at Raine's Foundation School
British male television writers